Orange Cathedral (Cathédrale Notre-Dame-de-Nazareth d'Orange) is a Roman Catholic church and former cathedral, and national monument of France, located in the town of Orange, Vaucluse.

History
The Cathedral of Notre-Dame-de-Nazareth in Orange dates originally from the 4th century. It was rebuilt in the Romanesque style in the twelfth century. Guillaume des Baux, Prince of Orange, attended its consecration in 1208. It was formerly the seat of the Bishopric of Orange, suppressed by the Concordat of 1801. It then became a parish church. During the French Revolution, it was a temple of the Goddess of Reason.

References

External links

Location

Churches in Vaucluse
Former cathedrals in France